The Hiwi call themselves the “people of the savannah” for the vast flatlands they inhabit between the Meta and Vichada rivers in Colombia. In Venezuela, the Hiwi live in the states of Apure, Guarico, Bolivar, and Amazonas. Seventeenth- and eighteenth-century historians described the Hiwi as nomadic hunter-gatherers. Their long history of violent conflict, extending well into the twentieth century, has meant dramatic changes in their way of life.

Today, when the Hiwi visit criollo towns, they wear European-style clothing: shirts and pants for the men, and cotton dresses for the women. In their own villages, many continue to wear traditional loincloths made of cloth or of a vegetable bark called marima.

Traditional clothing also includes body ornaments. The Hiwi make necklaces of glass beads as well as shamanic amulet necklaces for ceremonial use, made with animal teeth, hooves, and beaks.

Textile crafts are an important part of their material culture. Using looms, the Hiwi weave high-quality hammocks with moriche or cumare fibers.

Historically, basketry has been a male occupation among the Hiwi, and the baskets they weave for transporting and storing foodstuffs are decorated with red and black geometric designs. Recently, women have begun to make baskets for commercial sale.

Some Hiwi still make pottery, although far fewer since the introduction of aluminum pots and plastic containers. Traditionally an activity of the dry season, vessels are made by rolling rings of clay over a base. After they dry, they are burned over an open fire and then decorated with vegetable dyes such as cumare and caruto.

Despite a reputation as less than excellent navigators, the Hiwi do make curiaras and oars. The curiaras are made from a tree similar to the cedar. After the bark is removed, they use fire, hatchets, and machetes to shape the wood. From the same wood, they produce oars with round handles and oval paddles. Although made by hand, the completed curiara looks newly manufactured.

The Hiwi make wind and percussion musical instruments for festivities and ceremonial rituals, such as flutes with three holes made from large deer bones. Pan flutes, made with five or six tubes of caña amarga, often are played with another musical instrument made from the skull and antlers of the deer.

The maraca, the shaman’s principal musical instrument, is traditionally used for healing. The body of a maraca is made from a dried gourd, which is then painted with geometric patterns. It is often decorated as well with a tuft of curassow feathers.

See also 
Guahibo people

External links
Orinoco Online
Hiwi, Arizona State University

Indigenous peoples in Venezuela
Ethnic groups in Colombia
Hunter-gatherers of South America

bs:Guahíbo
de:Híwi
es:Guahibo
hr:Guahíbo
it:Guahibo